Stewart Marjoribanks (1774 – 31 August 1863) was a British Whig politician, and wine merchant.

Family
Marjoribanks was the third son of Edward Marjoribanks of Hallyards and Lees, Berwick, and Grizel née Stewart, daughter of Archibald Stewart of Edinburgh and Mitcham, Surrey; and the brother of Sir John Marjoribanks, 1st Baronet. He married twice, first to Eleanor, illegitimate daughter of Archibald Paxton, in 1798 and they had one son—Archibald John Marjoribanks—before her death in 1799. In 1841, he married Lucy, daughter of Edward Roger Pratt, and they had no children.

Merchant
By 1798, after presumably working for him, Marjoribanks was in partnership with Paxton as a wine merchant, marrying Eleanor in the same year. On Paxton's death in 1817, Marjoribanks continued his business in conjunction with Paxton's son, William Gill Paxton; Marjoribanks' elder brother, Campbell, joined as a director of the company in 1807, becoming a chairman three times. At some point, it appears Marjoribanks became involved in the work of the East India Company, pursuing this line by 1817 and becoming a shipowner for the company on a "considerable scale" later on. By 1832, he had withdrawn from the wine business, and by 1840, he is considered to have sold his majority stake in his East India agency.

New Zealand Company
In 1825 Marjoribanks was a director of the New Zealand Company, a venture chaired by the wealthy John George Lambton, Whig MP (and later 1st Earl of Durham), that made the first attempt to colonise New Zealand.

Pacific Pearl Fishery Company
Also in 1825 Marjoribanks was one of the founders of the Pacific Pearl Fishery Company. The expedition's objective was partially commercial (exploring trade possibilities in the Society Islands), and patially scientific. The scientist Samuel Stutchbury was the expedition' scientist.

Political career
By 1820, Marjoribanks was pursuing a political career. In that year's general election, he stood for Hythe and—with the help of a non-existent opposition, money, and patronage of the East India Company—he was "virtually impregnable". He declared independence from partisanship, however, stating to James Loch on the eve of the election that "I am not a Whig". Then, at the nomination, he was reported as declaring he:

Marjoribanks' election was successful but, as a Member of Parliament, he began voting with the Whig opposition on most major issues, joining Brooks's Club in 1823—but also voting with the Tories on issues including against the omission of arrears from the Duke of Clarence's grant in 1821. During this period he voted for Catholic emancipation, economy, retrenchment, and reduced taxation, as well as parliamentary reform—and was, in 1824, was described by James Abercromby as having "a very odd temper, which makes it difficult to deal with him".

He was returned unopposed at the 1826 general election, during which he again professed his independence. After this, he voted against the Duke of Clarence's grant and for Catholic emancipation. he voted for chancery reform, the disenfranchisement of Penryn, and the repeal of the Test Acts. On most major divisions on retrenchment, he voted with the Whig opposition.

By the 1830 general election, Marjoribanks was to all intents and purposes considered a Whig. He was returned for Hythe once more, alongside his cousin and chairman of the East India Company, John Loch, against opposition. After the election, he requested in an "anxious wish" from the Tory patronage secretary Joseph Planta for James Redsull to be made a Cinque Ports pilot. Planta noted:

Marjoribanks' request was neither initially approved nor denied and a decision was made to consider this "at the proper time" as there was no appointment of pilots scheduled for that year. In the end, nothing came of the request.

In the press, Marjoribanks was now considered a "Wellington Whig" despite Tory ministers considering him a foe. In this period of his parliamentary career, he voted in favour of parliamentary reform, and for inquiries into grievances of West Indian sugar producers.

At the 1832 general election, Hythe was reduced to a single-member seat and Marjoribanks was again returned, opposed by a single Tory candidate. In the campaign, he expressed "cautious support" for the abolition of slavery, and described himself as "neither a republican, nor a radical". He held the seat until 1837, when he resigned by accepting the office of Steward of the Chiltern Hundreds, before standing unopposed for the seat again in 1841 and holding the seat until 1847 when he did not seek re-election.

Death
Marjoribanks died in August 1863, leaving legacies in excess of £33,000. His estate, including property in Tasmania, Australia, was divided between his nephews Edward Marjoribanks and Dudley Marjoribanks, 1st Baron Tweedmouth.

References

External links
 

UK MPs 1820–1826
UK MPs 1826–1830
UK MPs 1830–1831
UK MPs 1831–1832
UK MPs 1832–1835
UK MPs 1835–1837
UK MPs 1847–1852
UK MPs 1841–1847
Whig (British political party) MPs for English constituencies
1774 births
1863 deaths